I Hear You John is an album by vibraphonist Walt Dickerson and percussionist Jimmi Johnsun recorded in Denmark in 1978 for the SteepleChase label. The 1995 CD reissue added an additional track featuring Andy McKee.

Reception

Allmusic gave the album 3 stars.

Track listing
All compositions by Walt Dickerson.
 "I Hear You John" – 35:19 	
 "We Wish You Well, Wilbur Ware" – 38:05 Bonus track on CD reissue

Personnel 
Walt Dickerson – vibraphone
Jimmi Johnsun – drums
Andy McKee – bass (track 2)

References 

1981 live albums
Walt Dickerson live albums
SteepleChase Records live albums